The cereal grain wheat is subject to numerous wheat diseases, including bacterial, viral and fungal diseases, as well as parasitic infestations.

Principal diseases

 Barley yellow dwarf virus, BYDV
 Brown rust Puccinia recondita
 Common bunt (aka Covered smut) Tilletia caries
 Ergot Claviceps purpurea
 Eyespot Pseudocercosporella herpotrichoides
 Glume blotch Septoria nodorum
 septoria leaf blotch Mycosphaerella graminicola, synonyms: Septoria tritici, Zymoseptoria tritici
 Mildew Erysiphe graminis
 Seedling blight Fusarium spp., Septoria nodorum
 Sharp eyespot Rhizoctonia cerealis
 Spot blotch Biplolaris sorokiana
 Take-all Gaeumannomyces graminis
 Tan spot Pyrenophora tritici-repentis
 Yellow rust Puccinia striiformis

In Europe
Cereals are at risk from numerous diseases due to the level of intensification necessary for profitable production since the 1970s. More recently varietal diversification, good plant breeding and the availability of effective fungicides have played a prominent part in cereal disease control. Use of break crops and good rotations are also good cultural control measures. The demise of UK straw burning in the 1980s also increased the importance of good disease control.

Active control measures include use of chemical seed treatments for seed-borne diseases and chemical spray applications for leaf and ear diseases. Development of resistance by diseases to established chemicals has been a problem during the previous 30 years.

In the USA
Wheat is subject to more diseases than other grains, and, in some seasons, especially in wet ones, heavier losses are sustained from those diseases than are in other cereal crops. Wheat may suffer from the attack of insects at the root; from blight, which primarily affects the leaf or straw, and ultimately deprives the grain of sufficient nourishment; from mildew on the ear; and from gum of different shades, which lodges on the chaff or cups in which the grain is deposited.

Fungicides
Fungicides used on wheat, grouped by type, with examples of the active chemical ingredient:

Benzimidazoles
benomyl
carbendazim
Ergosterol biosynthesis inhibitors
prochloraz
flutriafol
tetraconazole
Morpholines
fenpropimorph
 Succinate dehydrogenase inhibitors (SDHI)
Succinate-analogue inhibitors 
Ubiquinone type inhibitors
boscalid, a pyridine-carboxamide
fluopyram, a pyrimide (pyridinyl ethylbenzamide)
fluxapyroxad, a pyrazole-carboxamide 
oxycarboxin, oxathiin-carboxamide
Strobylurines
kresoxim-methyl
Phthalonitriles
chlorothalonil

References

Further reading
 Cook, R. James and Veseth, Roger (1991) Wheat Health Management APS Press, St. Paul, Minnesota, 
 Gair, R,; Jenkins, J. E. E.; Lester, E. and Bassett, Peter (1987) Cereal Pests and Diseases (4th edition) Farming Press, Ipswich, England, 
 Sharma, Indu (editor) (2012). Disease Resistance in Wheat CABI, Wallingford, Oxfordshire, Google books

External links
Wheat Diseases and Pests: A Guide for Field Identification Excellent color guide from CIMMYT
USDA Cereal Disease Laboratory Many information resources
Identifying and Managing Wheat Rusts, Kansas State University
CropMonitor - UK Resource for in-season wheat disease control Excellent tool for agronomists and growers

 
Diseases